Claire, Duchess of Duras (née de Kersaint; 1777–1828) was a French writer best known for her 1823 novel called Ourika, which examines issues of racial and sexual equality, and which inspired the 1969 John Fowles novel The French Lieutenant's Woman.

Biography

Claire de Duras left her native France for London during the French Revolution in 1789, and returned to France in 1808 as the Duchess of Duras.  She maintained a famous literary salon in post-Revolutionary Paris and was the close friend of Chateaubriand, who she had met while in exile in London, and who helped her to publish her books.

Ourika was published anonymously in 1823, one of five novels Claire de Duras had written during the previous year; only two of them were published during her lifetime.  The three novellas that she did publish were only done so in order to prevent any possible plagiarism.

Claire de Duras treated complex and controversial subjects, primarily dealing with oppressed/marginalized characters.  She explored many fundamental principles of the French Revolution, and touched upon the intellectual debates of the Age of Enlightenment, particularly the equality of all men—and women. In holding with these subjects, tragedy is a common theme. For a long time she was seen as the writer of small and unimportant sentimental novels, but recent criticism has revealed her works to be treasure troves of postmodern identity theory.

Works

Published during her life
Olivier (1822)
Ourika  (1823)
Edouard (1825)

Published posthumously
Pensées de Louis XIV, extraites de ses ouvrages et de ses lettres manuscrites. Thoughts of Louis XIV: extracts of his writings. (1827)

Unfinished works
Le Moine du Saint-Bernard. The Monk of Saint-Bernard.
Les Mémoires de Sophie. Sophie's Memoirs.

References

 Kadish, Doris Y.; Massardier-Kenney, Françoise et al., Translating slavery: gender and race in French women's writing, 1783-1823, Kent, Kent State University Press, 1994.
 Kadish, Doris Y., Ourika’s Three Versions: A Comparison, Translating Slavery: Gender and Race in French Women’s Writing, 1783-1823, Éd. Françoise Massardier-Kenney, Préf. Albrecht Neubert, Gregory M. Shreve, Kent, Kent State UP, 1994, xiv, p. 217-28.

External links
 
 

1777 births
1828 deaths
Writers from Brest, France
French women novelists
French salon-holders